Fred McFeely Rogers (March 20, 1928 – February 27, 2003), better known as Mister Rogers, was an American television host, author, producer, and Presbyterian minister. He was the creator, showrunner, and host of the preschool television series Mister Rogers' Neighborhood, which ran from 1968 to 2001.

Born in Latrobe, Pennsylvania, near Pittsburgh, Rogers earned a bachelor's degree in music from Rollins College in 1951. He began his television career at NBC in New York, returning to Pittsburgh in 1953 to work for children's programming at NET (later PBS) television station WQED. He graduated from Pittsburgh Theological Seminary with a bachelor's degree in divinity in 1962 and became a Presbyterian minister in 1963. He attended the University of Pittsburgh's Graduate School of Child Development, where he began his 30-year collaboration with child psychologist Margaret McFarland. He also helped develop the children's shows The Children's Corner (1955) for WQED in Pittsburgh and Misterogers (1963) in Canada for the Canadian Broadcasting Corporation. In 1968, he returned to Pittsburgh and adapted the format of his Canadian series to create Mister Rogers' Neighborhood. It ran for 33 years and was critically acclaimed for focusing on children's emotional and physical concerns, such as death, sibling rivalry, school enrollment, and divorce.

Rogers died of stomach cancer in 2003, aged 74. His work in children's television has been widely lauded, and he received more than 40 honorary degrees and several awards, including the Presidential Medal of Freedom in 2002 and a Lifetime Achievement Emmy in 1997. He was inducted into the Television Hall of Fame in 1999. Rogers influenced many writers and producers of children's television shows, and his broadcasts provided comfort during tragic events, even after his death.

Early life
Rogers was born on March 20, 1928, at 705 Main Street in Latrobe, Pennsylvania, about  outside of Pittsburgh. His father, James Hillis Rogers, was "a very successful businessman" who was president of the McFeely Brick Company, one of Latrobe's most prominent businesses. His mother, Nancy (née McFeely), knitted sweaters for American soldiers from western Pennsylvania who were fighting in Europe and regularly volunteered at the Latrobe Hospital. Initially dreaming of becoming a doctor, she settled for a life of hospital volunteer work. Her father, Fred Brooks McFeely, after whom Rogers was named, was an entrepreneur.

Rogers grew up in a large three-story brick house at 737 Weldon Street in Latrobe. He had a sister, Elaine, whom the Rogerses adopted when he was 11 years old. Rogers spent much of his childhood alone, playing with puppets, and also spent time with his grandfather. He began playing the piano when he was five. Through an ancestor who immigrated from Germany to the U.S., Johannes Meffert (born 1732), Rogers is the sixth cousin of American actor Tom Hanks, who portrays him in the film A Beautiful Day in the Neighborhood (2019).

Rogers had a difficult childhood. Shy, introverted, and overweight, he was frequently homebound after suffering bouts of asthma. He was bullied as a child for his weight and called "Fat Freddy". According to Morgan Neville, director of the 2018 documentary Won't You Be My Neighbor?, Rogers had a "lonely childhood... I think he made friends with himself as much as he could. He had a ventriloquist dummy, he had [stuffed] animals, and he would create his own worlds in his childhood bedroom".

Rogers attended Latrobe High School, where he overcame his shyness. "It was tough for me at the beginning," Rogers told NPR's Terry Gross in 1984. "And then I made a couple friends who found out that the core of me was okay. And one of them was... the head of the football team". He became president of the student council, a member of the National Honor Society, and editor-in-chief of the school yearbook. He registered for the draft in Greensburg, Pennsylvania in 1948 at age 20, where he was classified 1-A (available for military service). However, his status was changed to unqualified for military service following an Armed Forces physical on October 12, 1950. He attended Dartmouth College for one year before transferring to Rollins College in Winter Park, Florida, where he graduated magna cum laude in 1951 with a Bachelor of Music.

He graduated magna cum laude from Pittsburgh Theological Seminary in 1962 with a Bachelor of Divinity, and was ordained a minister by the Pittsburgh Presbytery of the United Presbyterian Church in 1963. His mission as an ordained minister, rather than a church pastor, was to minister to children and their families through television. He regularly appeared before church officials to maintain his ordination.

Career

Early work
Rogers wanted to enter seminary after college, but instead chose to go into the nascent medium of television after encountering a TV at his parents' home in 1951 during his senior year at Rollins College. In a CNN interview, he said, "I went into television because I hated it so, and I thought there's some way of using this fabulous instrument to nurture those who would watch and listen". After graduating in 1951, he worked at NBC in New York City as floor director of Your Hit Parade, The Kate Smith Hour, and Gabby Hayes's children's show, and as an assistant producer of The Voice of Firestone.

In 1953, Rogers returned to Pittsburgh to work as a program developer at public television station WQED. Josie Carey worked with him to develop the children's show The Children's Corner, which Carey hosted. Rogers worked off-camera to develop puppets, characters, and music for the show. He used many puppet characters developed during this time, such as Daniel the Striped Tiger (named after WQED's station manager, Dorothy Daniel, who gave Rogers a tiger puppet before the show's premiere), King Friday XIII, Queen Sara Saturday (named after Rogers's wife), X the Owl, Henrietta, and Lady Elaine, in his later work. Children's television entertainer Ernie Coombs was an assistant puppeteer. The Children's Corner won a Sylvania Award for best locally produced children's programming in 1955 and was broadcast nationally on NBC. While working on the show, Rogers attended Pittsburgh Theological Seminary and was ordained as a Presbyterian minister in 1963. He also attended the University of Pittsburgh's Graduate School of Child Development, where he began working with child psychologist Margaret McFarland—who, according to Rogers's biographer Maxwell King, became his "key advisor and collaborator" and "child-education guru". Much of Rogers's "thinking about and appreciation for children was shaped and informed" by McFarland. She was his consultant for most of Mister Rogers' Neighborhoods scripts and songs for 30 years.

In 1963, the Canadian Broadcasting Corporation (CBC) in Toronto contracted Rogers to develop and host the 15-minute black-and-white children's program Misterogers; it lasted from 1963 to 1967. It was the first time Rogers appeared on camera. CBC's children's programming head Fred Rainsberry insisted on it, telling Rogers, "Fred, I've seen you talk with kids. Let's put you yourself on the air". Coombs joined Rogers in Toronto as an assistant puppeteer. Rogers also worked with Coombs on the children's show Butternut Square from 1964 to 1967. He acquired the rights to Misterogers in 1967 and returned to Pittsburgh with his wife, two young sons, and the sets he developed, despite a potentially promising career with CBC and no job prospects in Pittsburgh. On Rogers' recommendation, Coombs remained in Toronto and became Rogers' Canadian equivalent of an iconic television personality, creating the long-running children's program Mr. Dressup, which ran from 1967 to 1996. Rogers's work for CBC "helped shape and develop the concept and style of his later program for the Public Broadcasting Service (PBS) in the U.S."

Mister Rogers' Neighborhood

Mister Rogers' Neighborhood (also called the Neighborhood), a half-hour educational children's program starring Rogers, began airing nationally in 1968 and ran for 895 episodes. It was videotaped at WQED in Pittsburgh and broadcast by National Educational Television (NET), which later became the Public Broadcasting Service (PBS). Its first season had 180 black-and-white episodes. Each subsequent season, filmed in color and funded by PBS, the Sears-Roebuck Foundation, and other charities, consisted of 65 episodes. By the time it ended production in December 2000, its average rating was about 0.7% of television households or 680,000 homes, and it aired on 384 PBS stations. At its peak in 1985–1986, its ratings were 2.1%, or 1.8 million homes. The last original episode aired in 2001, but PBS continued to air reruns, and by 2016 it was the third-longest-running program in PBS history.

Many of the sets and props in Mister Rogers' Neighborhood, like the trolley, the sneakers, and the castle, were created for Rogers's show in Toronto by CBC designers and producers. The program also "incorporated most of the highly imaginative elements that later became famous", such as its slow pace and its host's quiet manner. The format of Mister Rogers' Neighborhood "remained virtually unchanged" for the entire run of the program. Every episode begins with a camera's-eye view of a model of a neighborhood, then panning in closer to a representation of a house while a piano instrumental of the theme song, "Won't You be My Neighbor?", performed by music director Johnny Costa and inspired by a Beethoven sonata, is played. The camera zooms in to a model representing Mr. Rogers's house, then cuts to the house's interior and pans across the room to the front door, which Rogers opens as he sings the theme song to greet his visitors while changing his suit jacket to a cardigan (knitted by his mother) and his dress shoes to sneakers, "complete with a shoe tossed from one hand to another". The episode's theme is introduced, and Mr. Rogers leaves his home to visit another location, the camera panning back to the neighborhood model and zooming in to the new location as he enters it. Once this segment ends, Mr. Rogers leaves and returns to his home, indicating that it is time to visit the Neighborhood of Make-Believe. Mr. Rogers proceeds to the window seat by the trolley track and sets up the action there as the Trolley comes out. The camera follows it down a tunnel in the back wall of the house as it enters the Neighborhood of Make-Believe. The stories and lessons take place over a week's worth of episodes and involve puppets and human characters. The end of the visit occurs when the Trolley returns to the same tunnel from which it emerged, reappearing in Mr. Rogers's home. He then talks to the viewers before concluding the episode. He often feeds his fish, cleans up any props he has used, and returns to the front room, where he sings the closing song while changing back into his dress shoes and jacket. He exits the front door as he ends the song, and the camera zooms out of his home and pans across the neighborhood model as the episode ends.

Mister Rogers' Neighborhood emphasized young children's social and emotional needs, and unlike another PBS show, Sesame Street, which premiered in 1969, did not focus on cognitive learning. Writer Kathy Merlock Jackson said, "While both shows target the same preschool audience and prepare children for kindergarten, Sesame Street concentrates on school-readiness skills while Mister Rogers Neighborhood focuses on the child's developing psyche and feelings and sense of moral and ethical reasoning". The Neighborhood also spent fewer resources on research than Sesame Street, but Rogers used early childhood education concepts taught by his mentor Margaret McFarland, Benjamin Spock, Erik Erikson, and T. Berry Brazelton in his lessons. As the Washington Post noted, Rogers taught young children about civility, tolerance, sharing, and self-worth "in a reassuring tone and leisurely cadence". He tackled difficult topics such as the death of a family pet, sibling rivalry, the addition of a newborn into a family, moving and enrolling in a new school, and divorce. For example, he wrote a special segment that dealt with the assassination of Robert F. Kennedy that aired on June 7, 1968, days after the assassination occurred.

According to King, the process of putting each episode of Mister Rogers' Neighborhood together was "painstaking" and Rogers's contribution to the program was "astounding". Rogers wrote and edited all the episodes, played the piano and sang for most of the songs, wrote 200 songs and 13 operas, created all the characters (both puppet and human), played most of the significant puppet roles, hosted every episode, and produced and approved every detail of the program. The puppets created for the Neighborhood of Make-Believe "included an extraordinary variety of personalities". They were simple puppets but "complex, complicated, and utterly honest beings". In 1971, Rogers formed Family Communications, Inc. (FCI, now The Fred Rogers Company), to produce the Neighborhood, other programs, and non-broadcast materials.

In 1975, Rogers stopped producing Mr. Rogers' Neighborhood to focus on adult programming. Reruns of the Neighborhood continued to air on PBS. King reports that the decision caught many of his coworkers and supporters "off guard". Rogers continued to confer with McFarland about child development and early childhood education, however. In 1979, after an almost five-year hiatus, Rogers returned to producing the Neighborhood; King calls the new version "stronger and more sophisticated than ever". King writes that by the program's second run in the 1980s, it was "such a cultural touchstone that it had inspired numerous parodies", most notably Eddie Murphy's parody on Saturday Night Live in the early 1980s.

Rogers retired from producing the Neighborhood in 2001 at age 73, although reruns continued to air. He and FCI had been making about two or three weeks of new programs per year for many years, "filling the rest of his time slots from a library of about 300 shows made since 1979". The final original episode of Mister Rogers' Neighborhood aired on August 31, 2001.

Other work and appearances

In 1969, Rogers testified before the U.S. Senate Subcommittee on Communications, which was chaired by Democratic Senator John Pastore of Rhode Island. U.S. President Lyndon Johnson had proposed a $20 million bill for the creation of PBS before he left office, but his successor, Richard Nixon, wanted to cut the funding to $10 million. Even though Rogers was not yet nationally known, he was chosen to testify because of his ability to make persuasive arguments and to connect emotionally with his audience. The clip of Rogers's testimony, which was televised and has since been viewed by millions of people on the internet, helped to secure funding for PBS for many years afterward. According to King, Rogers's testimony was "considered one of the most powerful pieces of testimony ever offered before Congress, and one of the most powerful pieces of video presentation ever filmed". It brought Pastore to tears and also, according to King, has been studied by public relations experts and academics. Congressional funding for PBS increased from $9 million to $22 million. In 1970, Nixon appointed Rogers as chair of the White House Conference on Children and Youth.

In 1978, while on hiatus from Mister Rogers' Neighborhood, Rogers wrote, produced, and hosted a 30-minute interview program for adults on PBS called Old Friends... New Friends. It lasted 20 episodes. Rogers's guests included Hoagy Carmichael, Helen Hayes, Milton Berle, Lorin Hollander, poet Robert Frost's daughter Lesley, and Willie Stargell.

In September 1987, Rogers visited Moscow to appear as the first guest on the long-running Soviet children's TV show Good Night, Little Ones! with host Tatiana Vedeneyeva. The appearance was broadcast in the Soviet Union on December 7, coinciding with the Washington Summit meeting between Soviet leader Mikhail Gorbachev and U.S. President Ronald Reagan in Washington D.C. Vedeneyeva visited the set of Mister Rogers' Neighborhood in November. Her visit was taped and later aired in March 1988 as part of Rogers's program. In 1994, Rogers wrote, produced, and hosted a special for PBS called Fred Rogers' Heroes, which featured interviews and portraits of four people from across the country who were having a positive impact on children and education. The first time Rogers appeared on television as an actor, and not himself, was in a 1996 episode of Dr. Quinn, Medicine Woman, playing a preacher.

Rogers gave "scores of interviews". Though reluctant to appear on television talk shows, he would usually "charm the host with his quick wit and ability to ad-lib on a moment's notice". Rogers was "one of the country's most sought-after commencement speakers", making over 150 speeches. His friend and colleague David Newell reported that Rogers would "agonize over a speech", and King reported that Rogers was at his least guarded during his speeches, which were about children, television, education, his view of the world, how to make the world a better place, and his quest for self-knowledge. His tone was quiet and informal but "commanded attention". In many speeches, including the ones he made accepting a Lifetime Achievement Emmy in 1997, for his induction into the Television Hall of Fame in 1999, and his final commencement speech at Dartmouth College in 2002, he instructed his audiences to remain silent and think for a moment about someone who had a good influence on them.

Personal life

Rogers met Sara Joanne Byrd (called "Joanne") from Jacksonville, Florida, while attending Rollins College. They were married from 1952 until he died in 2003. They had two sons, James and John. Joanne Rogers (fr) was "an accomplished pianist", who like Fred earned a Bachelor of Music from Rollins, and went on to earn a Master of Music from Florida State University. She performed publicly with her college classmate, Jeannine Morrison, from 1976 to 2008. According to biographer Maxwell King, Rogers's close associates said he was "absolutely faithful to his marriage vows".

Rogers was red-green color-blind. He became a pescatarian in 1970, after the death of his father, and a vegetarian in the early 1980s, saying he "couldn't eat anything that had a mother". He became a co-owner of Vegetarian Times in the mid-1980s and said in one issue, "I love tofu burgers and beets". He told Vegetarian Times that he became a vegetarian for both ethical and health reasons. According to his biographer Maxwell King, Rogers also signed his name to a statement protesting wearing animal furs. Rogers was a registered Republican, but according to Joanne Rogers, he was "very independent in the way he voted", choosing not to talk about politics because he wanted to be impartial. Rogers was a Presbyterian, and many of the messages he expressed in Mister Rogers' Neighborhood were inspired by the core tenets of Christianity. Rogers rarely spoke about his faith on air; he believed that teaching through example was as powerful as preaching. He said, "You don't need to speak overtly about religion in order to get a message across". According to writer Shea Tuttle, Rogers considered his faith a fundamental part of his personality and "called the space between the viewer and the television set 'holy ground'". But despite his strong faith, Rogers struggled with anger, conflict, and self-doubt, especially at the end of his life. He also studied Catholic mysticism, Judaism, Buddhism, and other faiths and cultures. King called him "that unique television star with a real spiritual life", emphasizing the values of patience, reflection, and "silence in a noisy world". King reported that despite Rogers's family's wealth, he cared little about making money, and lived frugally, especially as he and his wife grew older. King reported that Rogers's relationship with his young audience was important to him. For example, since hosting Misterogers in Canada, he answered every letter sent to him by hand. After Mister Rogers' Neighborhood began airing in the U.S., the letters increased in volume, and he hired staff member and producer Hedda Sharapan to answer them, but he read, edited, and signed each one. King wrote that Rogers saw responding to his viewers' letters as "a pastoral duty of sorts".

The New York Times called Rogers "a dedicated lap-swimmer", and Tom Junod, author of "Can You Say... Hero?", the 1998 Esquire profile of Rogers, said, "Nearly every morning of his life, Mister Rogers has gone swimming". Rogers began swimming when he was a child at his family's vacation home outside Latrobe, where they owned a pool, and during their winter trips to Florida. King wrote that swimming and playing the piano were "lifelong passions" and that "both gave him a chance to feel capable and in charge of his destiny", and that swimming became "an important part of the strong sense of self-discipline he cultivated". Rogers swam daily at the Pittsburgh Athletic Association, after waking every morning between 4:30 and 5:30 A.M. to pray and to "read the Bible and prepare himself for the day". He did not smoke or drink. According to Junod, he did nothing to change his weight from the  he weighed for most of his adult life; by 1998, this also included napping daily, going to bed at 9:30 P.M., and sleeping eight hours per night without interruption. Junod said Rogers saw his weight "as a destiny fulfilled", telling Junod, "the number 143 means 'I love you.' It takes one letter to say 'I' and four letters to say 'love' and three letters to say 'you'".

Death and memorials
After Rogers' retirement in 2001, he remained busy working with FCI, studying religion and spirituality, making public appearances, traveling, and working on a children's media center named after him at Saint Vincent College in Latrobe with Archabbot Douglas Nowicki, chancellor of the college. By the summer of 2002, his chronic stomach pain became severe enough for him to see a doctor about it, and in October 2002, he was diagnosed with stomach cancer. He delayed treatment until after he served as Grand Marshal of the 2003 Rose Parade, with Art Linkletter and Bill Cosby, in January. On January 6, Rogers underwent stomach surgery. He died less than two months later, on February 27, 2003, at his home in Pittsburgh, with his wife of 50 years, Joanne, at his side. While comatose shortly before his death, he received the last rites of the Catholic Church from Archabbot Nowicki.

The following day, the Pittsburgh Post-Gazette covered Rogers' death on the front page and dedicated an entire section to his death and impact. The newspaper also reported that by noon, the internet "was already full of appreciative pieces" by parents, viewers, producers, and writers. Rogers' death was widely lamented. Most U.S. metropolitan newspapers ran his obituary on their front page and some dedicated entire sections to coverage of his death. WQED aired programs about Rogers the evening he died; the Post-Gazette reported that the ratings for their coverage were three times higher than their normal ratings. That same evening, Nightline on ABC broadcast a rerun of a recent interview with Rogers; the program got the highest ratings of the day, beating the February average ratings of Late Show with David Letterman and The Tonight Show with Jay Leno. On March 4, the U.S. House of Representatives unanimously passed a resolution honoring Rogers sponsored by Representative Mike Doyle from Pennsylvania.

On March 1, 2003, a private funeral was held for Rogers in Unity Chapel, which was restored by Rogers' father, at Unity Cemetery in Latrobe. About 80 relatives, co-workers, and close friends attended the service, which "was planned in great secrecy so that those closest to him could grieve in private". Reverend John McCall, pastor of the Rogers family's church, Sixth Presbyterian Church in Squirrel Hill, gave the homily; Reverend William Barker, a retired Presbyterian minister who was a "close friend of Mr. Rogers and the voice of Mr. Platypus on his show", read Rogers' favorite Bible passages. Rogers was interred at Unity Cemetery in Latrobe, Pennsylvania, in a mausoleum owned by his mother's family.

On May 3, 2003, a public memorial was held at Heinz Hall in Pittsburgh. According to the Post-Gazette, 2,700 people attended. Violinist Itzhak Perlman, cellist Yo-Yo Ma (via video), and organist Alan Morrison performed in honor of Rogers. Barker officiated the service; also in attendance were Pittsburgh philanthropist Elsie Hillman, former Good Morning America host David Hartman, The Very Hungry Caterpillar author Eric Carle, and Arthur creator Marc Brown. Businesswoman and philanthropist Teresa Heinz, PBS President Pat Mitchell, and executive director of The Pittsburgh Project Saleem Ghubril gave remarks. Jeff Erlanger, who at age 10 appeared on Mister Rogers' Neighborhood in 1981 to explain his electric wheelchair, also spoke. The memorial was broadcast several times on Pittsburgh television stations and websites throughout the day.

Legacy

Marc Brown, creator of another PBS children's show, Arthur, considered Rogers both a friend and "a terrific role model for how to use television and the media to be helpful to kids and families". Josh Selig, creator of Wonder Pets, credits Rogers with influencing his use of structure and predictability, and his use of music, opera, and originality.

Rogers inspired Angela Santomero, co-creator of the children's television show Blue's Clues, to earn a degree in developmental psychology and go into educational television. She and the other producers of Blue's Clues used many of Rogers's techniques, such as using child developmental and educational research and having the host speak directly to the camera and transition to a make-believe world. In 2006, three years after Rogers's death and the end of production of Blue's Clues, the Fred Rogers Company contacted Santomero to create a show that would promote Rogers's legacy. In 2012, Daniel Tiger's Neighborhood, with characters from and based upon Mister Rogers' Neighborhood, premiered on PBS.

Rogers's style and approach to children's television and early childhood education also "begged to be parodied". Comedian Eddie Murphy parodied Mister Rogers' Neighborhood on Saturday Night Live during the 1980s. Rogers told interviewer David Letterman in 1982 that he believed parodies like Murphy's were done "with kindness in their hearts".

Video of Rogers's 1969 testimony in defense of public programming has experienced a resurgence since 2012, going viral at least twice. It first resurfaced after then presidential candidate Mitt Romney suggested cutting funding for PBS. In 2017, video of the testimony again went viral after President Donald Trump proposed defunding several arts-related government programs including PBS and the National Endowment for the Arts.

A roadside Pennsylvania Historical Marker dedicated to Rogers to be installed in Latrobe was approved by the Pennsylvania Historical and Museum Commission on March 4, 2014. It was installed on June 11, 2016, with the title "Fred McFeely Rogers (1928–2003)".

Won't You Be My Neighbor?, director Morgan Neville's 2018 documentary about Rogers's life, grossed over $22 million and became the top-grossing biographical documentary ever produced, the highest-grossing documentary in five years, and the 12th largest-grossing documentary ever made. The 2019 drama film A Beautiful Day in the Neighborhood tells the story of Rogers and his television series, with Tom Hanks portraying Rogers.

According to Caitlin Gibson of The Washington Post, Rogers became a source for parenting advice; she called him "a timeless oracle against a backdrop of ever-shifting parenting philosophies and cultural trends". Robert Thompson of Syracuse University noted that Rogers "took American childhood—and I think Americans in general—through some very turbulent and trying times", from the Vietnam War and the assassination of Robert Kennedy in 1968 to the 9/11 attacks in 2001. According to Asia Simone Burns of National Public Radio, in the years following the end of production on Mister Rogers' Neighborhood in 2001 and his death in 2003, Rogers became "a source of comfort, sometimes in the wake of tragedy". Burns has said Rogers's words of comfort "began circulating on social media" following tragedies such as the Sandy Hook Elementary School shooting in 2012, the Manchester Arena bombing in Manchester, England, in 2017, and the Stoneman Douglas High School shooting in Parkland, Florida, in 2018.

Awards and honors

Museum exhibits
 Smithsonian Institution permanent collection. In 1984, Rogers donated one of his sweaters to the Smithsonian.
 Children's Museum of Pittsburgh. Exhibit created by Rogers and FCI in 1998. It attracted hundreds of thousands of visitors over ten years. It included, from Mister Rogers' Neighborhood, one of his sweaters, a pair of his sneakers, original puppets from the program, and photographs of Rogers. The exhibit traveled to children's museums throughout the country for eight years until it was given to the Louisiana Children's Museum in New Orleans as a permanent exhibit to help them recover from Hurricane Katrina in 2005. In 2007, the Children's Museum of Pittsburgh created a traveling exhibit based on the factory tours featured in episodes of Mister Rogers' Neighborhood.
 Heinz History Center permanent collection (2018). In honor of the 50th anniversary of Mister Rogers' Neighborhood and what would have been Rogers's 90th birthday.  Exhibits include the iconic King Friday's blue castle, the Owl's tree and a tricycle ridden by courier Mr. McFeely.
 Louisiana Children's Museum. The museum contains an exhibit of Mister Rogers' Neighborhood, which debuted in 2007. The Children's Museum of Pittsburgh donated the exhibit.
 Fred Rogers Exhibit. The Exhibit displays the life, career, and legacy of Rogers and includes photos, artifacts from Mister Rogers' Neighborhood and clips of the program and interviews featuring Rogers. It is located at the Fred Rogers Center.

Art pieces
Several pieces of art are dedicated to Rogers throughout Pittsburgh, including a 7,000-pound, 11-foot-high bronze statue of him in the North Shore neighborhood. In the Oakland neighborhood, his portrait is included in the Martin Luther King Jr. and "Interpretations of Oakland" murals. A dinosaur statue titled "Fredasaurus Rex Friday XIII" originally stood in front of the WQED building and, as of 2014, stood in front of the building containing the Fred Rogers Company offices. There is a "Mister Rogers' Neighborhood of Make-Believe" in Idlewild Park and a kiosk of Mister Rogers' Neighborhood artifacts at Pittsburgh International Airport. The Carnegie Science Center's Miniature Railroad and Village debuted a miniature recreation of Rogers's house from Mister Rogers' Neighborhood in 2005.

Honorary degrees

Rogers has received honorary degrees from over 43 colleges and universities. After 1973, two commemorative quilts, created by two of Rogers's friends and archived at the Fred Rogers Center at St. Vincent College in Latrobe, were made out of the academic hoods he received during the graduation ceremonies.

Note: Much of the below list is taken from "Honorary Degrees Awarded to Fred Rogers", unless otherwise stated.

 Thiel College, 1969. Thiel also awards a yearly scholarship named for Rogers.
 Eastern Michigan University, 1973
 Saint Vincent College, 1973
 Christian Theological Seminary, 1973
 Rollins College, 1974
 Yale University, 1974
 Chatham College, 1975
 Carnegie Mellon University, 1976
 Lafayette College, 1977
 Waynesburg College, 1978
 Linfield College, 1982
 Slippery Rock State College, 1982
 Duquesne University, 1982
 Washington & Jefferson College, 1984
 University of South Carolina, 1985
 Hobart and William Smith Colleges, 1985
 Drury College, 1986
 MacMurray College, 1986
 Bowling Green State University, 1987
 Westminster College (Pennsylvania), 1987
 University of Indianapolis, 1988
 University of Connecticut, 1991
 Boston University, 1992
 Indiana University of Pennsylvania, 1992
 Moravian College, 1992
 Goucher College, 1993
 University of Pittsburgh, 1993
 West Virginia University, 1995
 North Carolina State University, 1996
 Edinboro University of Pennsylvania, 1998
 Marist College, 1999
 Westminster Choir College, 1999
 Old Dominion University, 2000
 Marquette University, 2001
 Middlebury College, 2001
 Dartmouth College, 2002
 Seton Hill University, 2003 (posthumous)
 Union College, 2003 (posthumous)
 Roanoke College, 2003 (posthumous)

Filmography

Television
{|class="wikitable sortable"
|-
! Year
! Title
|-
| 1954–1961
| The Children's Corner
|-
| 1963–1966

| Misterogers
|-
| 1964–1967
| Butternut Square
|-
| 1968–2001
| Mister Rogers' Neighborhood

|-
| 1977–1982
| Christmastime with Mister Rogers
|-
| 1978–1981

| Old Friends... New Friends
|-
| 1981

| Sesame Street
|-
| 1988

| Good Night, Little Ones!
|-

| 1991

| Where in the World Is Carmen Sandiego?

|-
| 1994

|Mr. Dressup's 25th Anniversary|-
| 1994

| Fred Rogers' Heroes|-
| 1996

| Dr. Quinn, Medicine Woman|-
| 1997

| Arthur|-
| 1998
| Wheel of Fortune|-
| 2003
| 114th Annual Tournament of Roses Parade|}

Published works
Children's books
 Our Small World (with Josie Carey, illustrated by Norb Nathanson), 1954, Reed and Witting, 
 The Elves, the Shoemaker, & the Shoemaker's Wife (illustrated by Richard Hefter), 1973, Small World Enterprises, 
 The Matter of the Mittens, 1973, Small World Enterprises, 
 Speedy Delivery (illustrated by Richard Hefter), 1973, Hubbard, 
 Henrietta Meets Someone New (illustrated by Jason Art Studios), 1974, Golden Press, 
 Mister Rogers Talks About, 1974, Platt & Munk, 
 Time to Be Friends, 1974, Hallmark Cards, 
 Everyone is Special (illustrated by Jason Art Studios), 1975, Western Publishing, 
 Tell Me, Mister Rogers, 1975, Platt & Munk, 
 The Costume Party (illustrated by Jason Art Studios), 1976, Golden Press, 
 Planet Purple (illustrated by Dennis Hockerman), 1986, Texas Instruments, 
 If We Were All the Same (illustrated by Pat Sustendal), 1987, Random House, 
 A Trolley Visit to Make-Believe (illustrated by Pat Sustendal), 1987, Random House, 
 Wishes Don't Make Things Come True (illustrated Pat Sustendal), 1987, Random House, 
 No One Can Ever Take Your Place (illustrated by Pat Sustendal), 1988, Random House, 
 When Monsters Seem Real (illustrated by Pat Sustendal), 1988, Random House, 
 You Can Never Go Down the Drain (illustrated by Pat Sustendal), 1988, Random House, 
 The Giving Box (illustrated by Jennifer Herbert), 2000, Running Press, 
 Good Weather or Not (with Hedda Bluestone Sharapan, illustrated by James Mellet), 2005, Family Communications, 
 Josephine the Short Neck-Giraffe, 2006, Family Communications, 
 A Beautiful Day in the Neighborhood: The Poetry of Mister Rogers Neighborhood (illustrated by Luke Flowers), 2009, Quirk Books, 
First Experiences series illustrated by Jim Judkis
 Going to Day Care, 1985, Putnam, 
 The New Baby, 1985, Putnam, 
 Going to the Potty, 1986, Putnam, 
 Going to the Doctor, 1986, Putnam, 
 Making Friends, 1987, Putnam, 
 Moving, 1987, Putnam, 
 Going to the Hospital, 1988, Putnam, 
 When a Pet Dies, 1988, Putnam, 
 Going on an Airplane, 1989, Putnam, 
 Going to the Dentist, 1989, Putnam, 
Let's Talk About It series
 Going to the Hospital, 1977, Family Communications, 
 Having an Operation, 1977, Family Communications, 
 So Many Things To See!, 1977, Family Communications, 
 Wearing a Cast, 1977, Family Communications, 
 Adoption, 1993, Putnam, 
 Divorce, 1994, Putnam, 
 Extraordinary Friends, 2000, Putnam, 
 Stepfamilies, 2001, Putnam, 

Songbooks
 Tomorrow on the Children's Corner (with Josie Carey, illustrated by Mal Wittman), 1960, Vernon Music Corporation, 
 Mister Rogers' Songbook (with Johnny Costa, illustrated by Steven Kellogg), 1970, Random House, 

Books for adults
 Mister Rogers Talks to Parents, 1983, Family Communications, 
 Mister Rogers' Playbook (with Barry Head, illustrated by Jamie Adams), 1986, Berkley Books, 
 Mister Rogers Talks with Families About Divorce (with Clare O'Brien), 1987, Berkley Books, 
 Mister Rogers' How Families Grow (with Barry Head and Jim Prokell), 1988, Berkley Books, 
 You Are Special: Words of Wisdom from America's Most Beloved Neighbor, 1994, Penguin Books, 
 Dear Mister Rogers, 1996, Penguin Books, 
 Mister Rogers' Playtime, 2001, Running Press, 
 The Mister Rogers Parenting Book, 2002, Running Press, 
 You are special: Neighborly Wisdom from Mister Rogers, 2002, Running Press, 
 The World According to Mister Rogers, 2003, Hyperion Books, 
 Life's Journeys According to Mister Rogers, 2005, Hyperion Books, 
 The Mister Rogers Parenting Resource Book, 2005, Courage Books, 
 Many Ways to Say I Love You: Wisdom For Parents And Children, 2019, Hachette Books, 

Discography
 Around the Children's Corner (with Josey Carey), 1958, Vernon Music Corporation, 
 Tomorrow on the Children's Corner (with Josie Carey), 1959
 King Friday XIII Celebrates, 1964
 Won't You Be My Neighbor?, 1967
 Let's Be Together Today, 1968
 Josephine the Short-Neck Giraffe, 1969
 You Are Special, 1969
 A Place of Our Own, 1970
 Come On and Wake Up, 1972
 Growing, 1992
 Bedtime, 1992
 Won't You Be My Neighbor? (cassette and book), 1994, Hal Leonard, 
 Coming and Going, 1997
 It's Such A Good Feeling: The Best Of Mister Rogers, 2019, Omnivore Recordings, posthumous release

See also
 Won't You Be My Neighbor?, 2018 documentary
 Mister Rogers: It's You I Like, 2018 documentary
 A Beautiful Day in the Neighborhood, 2019 biographical drama film
 List of vegetarians

Notes

References

Works cited
 Gross, Terry (1984). "Terry Gross and Fred Rogers". Fresh Air. NPR.
 King, Maxwell (2018). The Good Neighbor: The Life and Work of Fred Rogers. Abrams Press. .
 Tiech, John (2012). Pittsburgh Film History: On Set in the Steel City''. Charleston, North Carolina: The History Press. .

External links

 
 
 PBS Kids: Official Site
 The Fred M. Rogers Center
 The Fred Rogers Company (formerly known as Family Communications)
 
  1984 interview with Fred Rogers.
 The Music of Mister Rogers—Pittsburgh Music History
 
 Fred Rogers at Voice Chasers 
 

 
1928 births
2003 deaths
20th-century American composers
20th-century American male actors
20th-century American male writers
20th-century American singers
20th-century Presbyterians
21st-century Presbyterians
American children's television presenters
American male composers
American male singers
American male songwriters
American male television actors
American male voice actors
American philanthropists
American Presbyterian ministers
American Presbyterians
American puppeteers
American television hosts
Burials in Pennsylvania
Christianity in Pittsburgh
Columbia Records artists
Culture of Pittsburgh 
Dartmouth College alumni
Daytime Emmy Award winners
Deaths from cancer in Pennsylvania
Deaths from stomach cancer
Grammy Award winners
Male actors from Pittsburgh
Musicians from Pittsburgh
Omnivore Recordings artists
PBS people
Peabody Award winners
Pennsylvania Republicans
People from Latrobe, Pennsylvania
Pittsburgh Theological Seminary alumni
Presbyterians from Pennsylvania
Presidential Medal of Freedom recipients
Rollins College alumni
Singers from Pennsylvania
Songwriters from Pennsylvania
Television personalities from Pittsburgh
Television producers from Pennsylvania
United Presbyterian Church in the United States of America ministers
Vegetarianism activists
Writers from Pittsburgh
Articles containing video clips